École secondaire catholique Saint-Frère-André is a French-language Roman Catholic high school in Toronto, Ontario, Canada.

The school is operated by Conseil scolaire catholique MonAvenir. It occupies part of the former West Toronto Collegiate building, which it shares with École secondaire Toronto Ouest, a public French-language high school operated by Conseil scolaire Viamonde.

References

 Entrevue avec le directeur Hader Ibrahim 
 L’école secondaire catholique Saint-Frère-André prend vie

External links
École secondaire catholique Saint-Frère-André

High schools in Toronto
Educational institutions established in 2012
Catholic secondary schools in Ontario
2012 establishments in Ontario
French-language high schools in Ontario